Jim Buck may refer to:
 Jim Buck (dog walker)
 Jim Buck (politician)